Baig, also commonly spelled Bayg, Beigh, Beg, Bek, Bey, Baeg or Begh (Persian: بیگ, Beig, Turkish: Bey), was a Turkic title which is today used as a name to identify lineage. It means Chief or Commander and is an honorific title. It is common in Turkey, Iran, the Caucasus, Central Asia, South Asia and Southeast Europe and among their respective diaspora.

Etymology 
The origin of beg is still disputed, though it is mostly agreed that it is a Turkic loan-word. Two principal etymologies have been proposed. The first etymology is from a Middle Iranian form of Old Iranian baga; though the meaning would fit since the Middle Persian forms of the word often mean "lord", used for the king or others. The second etymology is from Chinese po "eldest (brother), (feudal) lord". Gerhard Doerfer seriously considers the possibility that the word is genuinely Turkic. Whatever the truth may be, there is no connection with Turkish berk, Mongolian berke "strong" or Turkish bögü, Mongolian böge "wizard, "shaman".

Baig and Beg was also subsequently used as a military rank in the Ottoman Empire.

It was also used by the Uyghurs, it permitted the Turkic Begs in the Altishahr region to maintain their previous status, and they administered the area for the Qing as officials. High-ranking Begs were allowed to call themselves Begs.

Use as a name

For the Persian use, it is common to see the name Beg added to the Persian suffix of 'zada' (male), 'zadi' (female), which means 'son of' or 'daughter of'. For Example: Sohaib Begzada or Hira Begzadi.
For the Turkish use, it is most common to see the spelling Beg or Bey utilized. (Sometimes, it is used along with the title "Mirza", similar to the Mughal usage)..

For the Mughal and Timurid dynasty use, the honorific title Mirza was added before the given name for all the males and 'Baig' for the males or Begum for the females, was added as a family name. For example: Mirza Sohaib Baig or Hira Begum. This was the historical naming convention for the descendants of the Mughal and Timurid dynasties, Today, however, it is common to see descendants of the Mughals and Timurids use Baig as a middle name and Mirza as the surname or vice versa. For example: Abdullah Baig Mirza or Abdullah Mirza Baig.

For the Slavic or Bosniak use, it is common to see the name Beg added to the Slavic suffix of 'ović', 'ovich', which roughly means 'descendant of'. While the title "Beg" is not in use in Bosnia anymore, track of families of "Beg" descent is kept. But a surname containing "-begović" suffix in itself is not a clear indicator of descent. For example, there is a number of "Begović" families, some are of noble descent, some not. "Idrizbegović" would be another example of a non-noble family with the suffix. Some examples of "beg" families are: Šahbegović, Rizvanbegović, Šačirbegović. On the other hand, "Kukavica" is an example of a famous "beg" family, not containing the title in itself. The book by Enver Imamović "Porijeklo i pripadnost stanovništva Bosne i Hercegovine" details the origin of a big number of families in Bosnia and Herzegovina.

There are various other alternative spellings used today as well, such as: Begh, Begg, Beigh, Beyg, Bayg, Bek, Bik.

Notable Beighs/Begs/Beghs/Beys/Baigs 

Afghanistan
Sultan Abu Sa'id Beg
Mohammad Murad Beg, Emir of Bokhara
Mir Yar Beg and Mir Yar Beg Sahibzada, Emir of Bokhara

Albania
Skanderbeg, Dominus Albaniae (lord of Albania)

Azerbaijan
Mirza Adigozal Bey, was an Azerbaijani historian of the 19th century.
Mirza Miran Shah Beg, was a son of Mirza Timur Beg, and a Timurid governor during his father's lifetime.
Elbey Mirza-Hasan oglu Rzaguliyev, was an Azerbaijani Soviet artist and stage director, and father of artist Ayten Rzaguliyeva.

Bangladesh
 Mirza Agha Muhammad Reza Baig - Iranian Shia Muslim immigrant living in the Sylhet region of Bengal. Claimed to be the Mahdi and twelfth imam, engaged in battles against the East India Company and Kachari Kingdom.
 Isfandiyar Beg - Mughal faujdar of Sylhet

Bosnia
Alija Izetbegović
Bakir Izetbegović
Asmir Begović
Denis Omerbegović
Elvir Omerbegovic
Mirza Begić
Senad Begić
Elvedin Begić
Aida Begić
Silvije Begić
Isa-Beg Isaković
Isak-Beg
Gazi Husrev-beg
Ali-paša Rizvanbegović
Safvet beg Bašagić
Turahan Bey
Turahanoğlu Ömer Bey
Central Asia
 Shadi Beg
 Jani Beg
 Timur-Malik
 Temür Qutlugh

India
Abbas Ali Baig, Indian Test cricketer
Aghajan Baig, Indian comic actor 
Mahmud Begada, Sultan of Gujarat
Mirza Asadullah Baig Khan
Mirza Babur Beg, the first Mughal emperor
Mirza Muhammad Akbar Beg, He was the third and one of the greatest rulers of the Mughal Dynasty in India.
Mirza Abul-Qasim Babur bin Baysonqor Beg, was a Timurid ruler in Khurasan (1449–1457).
Mirza Mehboob Beg, is an Indian politician belonging to Jammu & Kashmir National Conference.He was elected to the 15th Lok Sabha from Anantnag.
Mirza Farhatullah Baig,  was an Indian Urdu writer of humor and prose.
Mirza Ibrahim Beg, was Subahdar of Bengal during the reign of emperor Jahangir Beg.
Wali Beg Zul-Qadr, Soldier under Akbar Mirza Mughal Emperor.
Tardi Beg, was a military commander in the 16th century in Mughal India.
 Mirza Afzal Beg was the first Deputy Chief Minister of Jammu and Kashmir. He was the founder of All Jammu and Kashmir Plebiscite Front.

Iran
Ulugh Beg
Sultan Ibrahim Beg
Otar Beg
Nader Qoli Beyg

Kashgar
Yaqub Beg

Pakistan
Mirza Athar Baig, author
General Mirza Aslam Baig, retired Chief of Army Staff (Pakistan)
Adina Beg, was the governor of the Punjab including Lahore, Jalandhar and Multan from 1755 to 1758.
Idrees Baig, Test cricket umpire
Mirza Aslam Baig
Mirza Aziz Akbar Baig
Mirza Iqbal Baig is a sports journalist and cricket commentator who currently works as a television show host.
Mirza Nazeer Baig Mughal is an actor. He has acted in several films, telefilms, and TV drama serials.
Brigadier Mohammad Abbas Baig, a Pakistan Army one-star officer, dubbed "Baba-e-Artillery" (father of the Artillery) for his role in establishing  artillery in the Pakistani army. He was also a wealthy landlord in Muzaffargarh
Naeem Baig is a novelist and short-story writer, who has written articles, short stories, and novels in Urdu and English.
Obaidullah Baig was a scholar, Urdu writer/novelist, columnist, media expert, and most notably a documentary filmmaker from Karachi.
Rabiah Jamil Beg journalist
Mirza Rafiuddin 'Raz' Baig is a poet.
Diana Baig international cricket and football player from Gilgit Baltistan
Samina Baig only Pakistani woman to climb Mount Everest

Poland
Naiman-Beg

Russia
Mirza Kazem-Bey, Muhammad Ali Kazim-bey, was a famous orientalist, historian, and philologist of Azeri and Iranian origin.
Alexander Lvovich Kazembek (often spelled Kazem-Bek or Kasem-Beg), was a Russian émigré and political activist, and founder of the Mladorossi political group.
Iskander Mirza Huzman Beg Sulkiewicz, was a Polish politician of Tatar ethnicity, activist in socialist and independence movements and one of the co-founders of Polish Socialist Party.

Sri Lanka
Mohideen Baig, was a popular Sri Lankan musician.

Turkey
 Sultan Osman-bey, Sultan of the Ottoman Empire
 Mirza Tugay Bey, was a notable military leader and politician of the Crimean Tatars.

United Kingdom
Moazzam Begg, activist

United States
Ed Baig, technology columnist
Minhal Baig, director

See also

Mirza
 Bey
 Begum
 Beylerbey
 Begzada
 Atabeg
 Dey
 Khagan Bek
 Skanderbeg
 Naiman-Beg
 Marzban
 Ban
 Bai Baianai
 Anatolian beyliks
 Ottoman titles

Notes

References

Citations

Sources 

 

Turkic culture
Turkish titles
Indian surnames
Pakistani names
Titles in Pakistan
Titles in India
Qing dynasty
Royal titles
Titles
Noble titles
Ottoman titles
Military ranks
Positions of subnational authority
Titles of national or ethnic leadership
Noble titles of Egypt
Mughal nobility